USS Macdonough (DD-331) was a  built for the United States Navy during World War I.

Description
The Clemson class was a repeat of the preceding  although more fuel capacity was added. They had a crew of 6 officers and 108 enlisted men.

Performance differed radically between the ships of the class, often due to poor workmanship. The Clemson class was powered by two steam turbines, each driving one propeller shaft, using steam provided by four water-tube boilers.

The ships were armed with four 4-inch (102 mm) guns in single mounts and were fitted with two 1-pounder guns for anti-aircraft defense. In many ships a shortage of 1-pounders caused them to be replaced by 3-inch (76 mm) guns. Their primary weapon, though, was their torpedo battery of a dozen 21 inch (533 mm) torpedo tubes in four triple mounts. They also carried a pair of depth charge rails. A "Y-gun" depth charge thrower was added to many ships.

Construction and career
Macdonough, named for Thomas Macdonough, was laid down 24 May 1920 by the Bethlehem Shipbuilding Corporation, San Francisco, California; launched 15 December 1920; sponsored by Mrs. Charles W. Dabney, great-granddaughter of Commodore Thomas Macdonough; and commissioned 30 April 1921. Based at San Diego, California throughout her naval service, Macdonough operated primarily along the west coast. Periodic maneuvers and cruises with the Battle Fleet off the Pacific coast of Central America, the Hawaiian Islands, and in the Caribbean, as well as special assignments, intervened in her normal operations schedule. Included in her special assignments was a good will cruise with the fleet to Samoa, Australia, and New Zealand, 20 June to 26 September 1925.

On 22 March 1929, Macdonough returned to San Diego from fleet exercises held off Balboa, Panama Canal Zone, and operated off southern California until decommissioning at San Diego 8 January 1930. She was sold as scrap 20 December 1930.

See  for other ships of this name.

Notes

References

External links
http://www.navsource.org/archives/05/331.htm

Clemson-class destroyers
Ships built in San Francisco
1920 ships